Kate Wetherhead is an American actress, writer and director known for her work on Submissions Only, Legally Blonde, and the Jack and Louisa book series.

Early life and education
Kate was born in Burlington, Vermont, to Christine and Arnold Wetherhead. She began acting at age six and writing at seven. Wetherhead found her love for theatre after seeing a local production of West Side Story. She appeared in several shows at the University of Vermont, including Cat on a Hot Tin Roof and The Miracle Worker. She has a bachelor's degree in English from Wesleyan University and trained as an actor at Circle in the Square Theatre School.

Career
Wetherhead began her career in children's theatre, appearing off-Broadway in Sarah, Plain and Tall, Tatjana in Color, Summer of the Swans, and Cam Jansen, as well as touring with A Christmas Carol. She made her Broadway debut in 2005 as the understudy for Olive Ostrovsky, Logainne Schwartzandgrubenierre, and Marcy Park in The 25th Annual Putnam County Spelling Bee. She left the show to originate the roles of Kate and Chutney in the Broadway production of Legally Blonde. She left Legally Blonde in 2008, performing regionally in such shows as Steel Magnolias and Almost, Maine. In 2009 she starred as Deb in Ordinary Days by Adam Gwon for Roundabout Theatre Company. 

In 2010, she met Andrew Keenan-Bolger in a regional production of It's a Bird... It's a Plane... It's Superman, and, after collaborating on a behind-the-scenes video for the production, they decided to make a web series together. The two created the show Submissions Only, with Wetherhead writing and directing as well as playing the protagonist, Penny Reilly. In 2012, she returned to Off-Broadway in The Other Josh Cohen, for which she received a Drama Desk Award nomination. Submissions Only ended its third and final season in 2014. From 2013 to 2016, Wetherhead and Keenan-Bolger co-wrote the three-part children's book series Jack & Louisa, published by Penguin Group. The two also have a feature film in development with Sycamore Pictures.

In 2018, Wetherhead made her theatrical directorial debut at Bucks County Playhouse, directing Cinderella for the youth company. She has since directed Shrek The Musical (Jr.) for the playhouse, along with developmental readings and workshops for New York University and Michigan State University. In March 2021 it was announced that Wetherhead, with Paul Rudnick, would co-write a musical adaptation of The Devil Wears Prada. The musical premiered in Chicago in July 2022.

Personal life
Wetherhead is married to lighting designer Jeff Croiter.

Theatre

Filmography

Bibliography

Concerts

Discography

Awards and nominations

References

External links

American stage actresses
Living people
Year of birth missing (living people)
People from Burlington, Vermont
Wesleyan University alumni
Actresses from Vermont
American web series actresses
21st-century American actresses